Petrolina–Senador Nilo Coelho Airport  is the airport serving Petrolina, Pernambuco and Juazeiro, Bahia, Brazil. It is named after the Petrolina-born Senator Nilo de Sousa Coelho (1920–1983).

It is operated by CCR.

History
Petrolina Airport handles the export of fresh fruits from the São Francisco valley to Europe and the United States. The cargo terminal operates with 6 large coolers with capacity for 17,000 boxes each plus 2 cooler tunnels.

Previously operated by Infraero, on April 7, 2021 CCR won a 30-year concession to operate the airport.

Airlines and destinations

Passenger

Cargo

Access

See also

List of airports in Brazil

References

External links

Airports in Pernambuco
Petrolina